Tuxtla may refer to:

Cities and towns
Tuxtla Gutiérrez, capital of the Mexican state of Chiapas
San Andrés Tuxtla, Veracruz
Santiago Tuxtla, Veracruz
Tuxtla Chico, Chiapas

Other
Los Tuxtlas, region of Veracruz
Sierra de los Tuxtlas, mountain range in Veracruz
Tuxtla Statuette, early Olmec relic
Tuxtla quail-dove, bird of the family Columbidae
Tuxtla (plant) a Mesoamerican plant in the sunflower family